The Japanese submarine chaser CH-22 was a  of the Imperial Japanese Navy during World War II. She was built by Mitsubishi Heavy Industries, Yokohama, launched on 29 May 1941 and completed on 12 October 1941. On 24 August 1942, she left Rabaul as part of Operation RE, for the landings at Milne Bay.

Fate

References

External links

1941 ships
No.13-class submarine chasers
Ships sunk by US aircraft
Maritime incidents in February 1944
CH-22
World War II shipwrecks in the Pacific Ocean